Ross Perry (born 7 February 1990) is a Scottish footballer who plays as a centre back for Darvel. 

He has previously played for Rangers, Oxford United, Falkirk, Raith Rovers, Northampton Town, Brechin City, Clyde, Albion Rovers and Dumbarton.

Career
Perry's first appearance for Rangers came in a post-season friendly match against Los Angeles Galaxy at the Home Depot Center, coming on as a substitute for David Weir. This made him the first player born in the 1990s to play for the Rangers first team. Perry signed a two-year contract extension in October 2007.

On 28 August 2009, he joined Oxford United on a season-long loan. On 11 February 2011, he joined Falkirk in another loan spell, until the end of the 2010–11 season.

Perry made his professional Rangers debut in the Scottish Premier League on 13 August 2011, replacing Kyle Bartley in a match against Inverness CT. A week later, Perry was given his first start for Rangers, and played the full 90 minutes, helping keep a clean sheet in a 3–0 win away to Motherwell.

On 9 September 2011, Perry signed a new four-year contract with Rangers. Rangers entered administration in 2012 and were unable to agree a deal with its creditors. Perry agreed to transfer his contract.

Perry suffered ankle ligament damage during a pre-season friendly which meant that he did not play at all during the 2013–14 season. His contract with Rangers was cancelled by mutual consent in June 2014. In July 2014 Perry signed for Raith Rovers on a short-term deal. He left when this expired in early January 2015. He signed a short-term contract with Northampton Town in March 2015, however left the club in May 2015 without making any appearances. Perry then signed for Scottish League One side Brechin City in July 2015. He subsequently signed for Clyde in 2016, where he spent one season before being released in May 2017. He signed for Albion Rovers in July 2017, after a year at the club he signed for Dumbarton. Following an injury hit season with the Sons, Perry was released in May 2019 and signed for SJFA West Region Championship side Darvel.

Career statistics

Honours
Rangers
Scottish Third Division (1): 2012–13

References

External links

Living people
1990 births
Scottish footballers
Rangers F.C. players
Oxford United F.C. players
Falkirk F.C. players
Raith Rovers F.C. players
Northampton Town F.C. players
Brechin City F.C. players
Clyde F.C. players
Albion Rovers F.C. players
Association football defenders
Scottish Football League players
Scottish Premier League players
National League (English football) players
Scotland under-21 international footballers
Scotland youth international footballers
Dumbarton F.C. players
Footballers from Falkirk (council area)
People educated at Denny High School
West of Scotland Football League players